Krefeld-Oppum is a station in the city of Krefeld in the German state of North Rhine-Westphalia on the Duisburg-Ruhrort–Mönchengladbach railway. It consists of a passenger station, a railway repair shop, where Intercity-Express trains are also serviced, and a former freight yard.

History

The station was opened on the Duisburg-Ruhrort–Mönchengladbach railway in 1877 by the Rhenish Railway Company (Rheinische Eisenbahn-Gesellschaft). The railway repair shop was opened in 1892. The population of Oppum rose sharply with the opening of the station.

Installations

Railway repair shop

The first railway repair workshop was opened in Oppum as the Königliche Eisenbahn-Haupt-Reparaturwerkstatt Oppum, ("Royal Railway Main Repair Shop, Oppum"). Today, the Intercity-Express maintenance facility in Krefeld is a state-of-the-art facility for the maintenance of Deutsche Bahn rolling stock. A few thousand employees are employed there. ICE and electric multiple units used for regional transport are overhauled (all components of the vehicles are inspected, renewed or repaired) there. This includes servicing major items such as air conditioners, bogies and wheelsets, but also smaller parts such as shock absorbers. Several million Euros were invested in the modernisation of the plant in economic and environmental terms.

Over time, the railway repair shop has been greatly developed. In 1924 it became an Ausbesserungswerk (repair shop) and in 1955 it became the central point for dealing with the shock absorbers of passenger coaches. Since 2003, ICE trains have also been serviced there. It was renamed DB Fahrzeuginstandhaltung GmbH (DB maintenance) in 2004.

The plant is one of 15 large-scale plants in which rail rolling stock is serviced. It covers 202,000 m² and extends through four high-tech halls each with three levels; this allows all three levels of an ICE to be reached at the same time.

Former freight yard 

The Krefeld-Oppum freight yard was located about 700 metres west of the passenger station in the area of the street, "Am Verschubbahnhof". It has now closed. The city of Krefeld plans to use the site as a commercial site.

Passenger station

The passenger station is now a stop on two railway lines, the Lower Left Rhine Railway (Linksniederrheinische Strecke) and the Duisburg–Mönchengladbach railway. It is only served by regional services.

Every day, 4,000 commuters arrive or depart at Oppum station. The station access runs through a tunnel under the tracks. The Oppum weekly market is held near the station.

Links to public transport 

The following bus lines stop at Krefeld-Oppum station. They are operated by SWK Mobil.

Modification

The Krefeld-Oppum station was redeveloped up to 2015. The station was provided with lifts and the platforms were raised to ensure a stepless access to improve its accessibility. In addition, the station received information display boards and its appearance and its forecourt were upgraded in an urban style. The reconstruction works started on 7 April 2014.

References

Railway stations in North Rhine-Westphalia
Railway stations in Germany opened in 1877
Buildings and structures in Krefeld